Bororen is a rural town and  locality in the Gladstone Region, Queensland, Australia.

Geography
The town is located in the centre of the locality. The Bruce Highway enters from the south-east (Miriam Vale), passes through the town, and exits to the north (Foreshores).

The North Coast railway line also enters from the south-east (Miriam Vale), passes through the town which is served by the Bororen railway station, and exits to the north (Foreshores).

Boondilla is a neighbourhood in the north-west of the locality.

History
The name Bororen means old man kangaroo.

Bororen Post Office opened 2 June 1898; a receiving office had been open since about October 1897.

Bororen Provisional School opened on 22 January 1900. It became a State School in 1909.

Turkey Road State School opened on 1921 and closed on 24 May 1931. It was on Bates Road (approx ).

Bororen Anglican Church opened on 2 July 1931. It closed in 2015 and the building was later removed from the site. It was at 17 Dougall Street.

Bororen Presbyterian Church opened on Sunday 21 October 1923. It has been demolished.

In about 1995, a war memorial was unveiled on the Bruce Highway, Bororen. It commemorates those servicemen and women who served in World War I and World War II.

In the 2011 census, Bororen had a population of 417 people.

Education

Bororen State School is a government primary (Prep-6) school for boys and girls at 1 Kent Street. In 2017, the school had an enrolment of 37 students with 4 teachers (3 full-time equivalent) and 5 non-teaching staff (2 full-time equivalent). In 2018, the school had an enrolment of 31 students with 4 teachers (3 full-time equivalent) and 7 non-teaching staff (3 full-time equivalent).

There are no secondary schools in Bororen. The nearest government secondary schools are Miriam Vale State School (to Year 10) in neighbouring Miriam Vale to the south-east and Tannum Sands State High School (to Year 12) in Tannum Sands to the north.

References

Further reading

External links

  —includes Bororen

Towns in Queensland
Gladstone Region
Localities in Queensland